Benjamin is a figure in the Hebrew Bible.

Benjamin may also refer to:

Benjamin as sole name, or religious name
Tribe of Benjamin, one of the Tribes of Israel
Benjamin (Khazar), ruler during the 9th–10th centuries CE
Saint Benjamin (disambiguation), multiple people
Benjamin of Tudela (1130–1173), 12th century Spanish rabbi
Benjamin II, pen name of J. J. Benjamin (1818–1864), Romanian-Jewish historian and traveller; in allusion to Benjamin of Tudela
Pope Benjamin I of Alexandria (590–661), Coptic Pope
Pope Benjamin II of Alexandria (died 1339), Coptic Pope
Benjamin (Fedchenkov) (1880–1961), Russian orthodox bishop
Benjamin (born 1974), pen name of manhua artist Zhang Bin
King Benjamin, a figure in the Book of Mormon
Benjamin (singer) (born 1997), Finnish recording artist

People with the first name or surname Benjamin
 Benjamin (name)

Tribe of Benjamin members
Occasionally called as members of the tribe of Benjamin are:
Queen Esther, also known as Hadassah, the cousin of Mordecai the Jew - see the Book of Esther
Mordecai the Jew, from the Tribe of Benjamin - see Esther 2:5
Paul the Apostle or Paul the Jew from the Tribe of Benjamin- see Romans 11:1 and Phillipians 3:5
Saul, the first king of Israel - see 1 Samuel 9

Fictional characters
 Benjamin (Animal Farm), a character in George Orwell's Animal Farm
 Benjamin (Final Fantasy Mystic Quest), the protagonist of  Final Fantasy Mystic Quest
Benjamin Sisko, Commanding Officer of Deep Space Nine in the Star Trek: Deep Space Nine television series
 Benjamin Kirby Tennyson, the real name of a protagonist of Cartoon Network media franchise Ben 10
 Benjamin Lawson, the full name of the antagonist of the web serial and web series Ben Drowned
 Benjamin "Ben" Gross, a character portrayed by Jaren Lewison in the Netflix series Never Have I Ever

Other
 Benjamin, Missouri, a community in the United States
 Benjamin, Texas, a community in the United States
 Benjamin tree (disambiguation), a tree that produces benzoin that can be used in perfumery
 Benjamin the thylacine (died 1936), a Tasmanian tiger or thylacine
 Benjamin (1968 film), French film
 Benjamin (2018 British film), a comedy-drama feature film
 Benjamin (2018 American film), a comedy feature film
 Benjamin (automobile), a French manufacturer of cyclecars
 Benjamin, 2005 Beanie Baby bear produced by Ty, Inc.
 United States one-hundred-dollar bill, after the person pictured thereon, Benjamin Franklin

See also
Ben (disambiguation)
Benyamin (disambiguation)
The Curious Case of Benjamin Button (disambiguation)